Edward Bradley Saxon (born November 17, 1956) is an American film producer.

Early life
Saxon was born and raised in St. Louis, Missouri, and educated at Kirkwood High School from 1972 to 1976. 

He studied at McGill University from 1976 to 1980. While at McGill, he founded the Tuesday Night Cafe Theatre with Veronica Brady and Peter Grossman, and the company is still running today. Saxon acted in many plays at the Players' Theatre, McGill's famous Red and White Review. He also founded a radio comedy troupe called The Circle Jerks.

He then studied at The Peter Stark Producing Program at the USC School of Cinema-Television.

Career
Saxon is arguably best known for the film The Silence of the Lambs, which is, to date, the third and last film to sweep the five main categories of Academy Award for Best Actor, Best Actress, Best Adapted Screenplay, Best Director, and Best Picture. (The others are It Happened One Night and One Flew Over the Cuckoo's Nest.)

Formerly Jonathan Demme's producing partner, his films include Beloved, Ulee's Gold, That Thing You Do!, The Truth About Charlie, Married to the Mob, Miami Blues and Philadelphia.

After parting ways with Demme, Saxon produced Charlie Kaufman and Spike Jonze's Adaptation.. He produced Richard Linklater's Fast Food Nation in 2006. More recent projects include Away We Go, directed by Sam Mendes, and Our Family Wedding, starring Forest Whitaker and America Ferrera.

Originally an actor, Saxon was one of VH1's first VJ's in New York City. He has made several cameos in the films he has produced, most notably as a head in a jar in Silence of the Lambs.

Filmography
He was a producer in all films unless otherwise noted.

Film

As an actor

Thanks

Television

As an actor

External links
 Edward Saxon Productions
 
 Interview with Edward Saxon, Adaptation
 Edward Saxon and others discuss why so many novels never make it to the big screen, The Independent

Producers who won the Best Picture Academy Award
American film producers
1956 births
Living people
USC School of Cinematic Arts alumni
McGill University alumni